The Embassy of Ghana in Bamako is the diplomatic mission of the Republic of Ghana to Mali. It also serves as the official residence of the Ghana ambassador to Mali.

Ghana's diplomatic relations with Mali could be traced from the Ghana-Guinea-Mali Union. The union disbanded in May 1963 however Ghana and Mali continued to appoint ambassadors to represent their countries in the capital of their former ally. They were called; Resident Minister. The Embassy previously operated intermittently and was closed in April 1983 for economic reasons. The last opening was in October 2002.

Ghana's current ambassador to Mali is Francis Amanfoh.

List of Ambassadors

References

Bamako
Ghana
Ghana–Mali relations